The Bemba language, ChiBemba (also Cibemba, Ichibemba, Icibemba and Chiwemba), is a Bantu language spoken primarily in north-eastern Zambia by the Bemba people and as a lingua franca by about 18 related ethnic groups.

History

Bemba is one of the spoken languages in Zambia, spoken by many people who live in urban areas, and is one of Zambia's seven recognized regional languages. Zambia's first president, Kenneth Kaunda, though Malawian by descent, was raised in a Bemba-speaking community, and two of the four Zambian presidents since have been Bemba-speakers. The third president, Levy Mwanawasa, was a Lenje, from the Copperbelt Province who belong to the Bantu Botatwe (“three people”) ethnic grouping that comprises the Tonga-Lenje-Ila peoples. The Fourth President, Rupiah Bwezani Banda was a Chewa from the Eastern Province. In the years after the MMD took power in 1991, it was accused numerous times of promoting Bemba over other regional languages in the country. Although the lingua franca of the Zambian capital Lusaka is a dialect of Bantu Botatwe.

Dialects

Bemba has several dialects, many being varieties of Bemba spoken by other tribes which have historically fallen under Bemba influence. They include Chishinga, Lomotwa, Ngoma, Nwesi, 
Lala, Kabende, Luunda, Mukulu, Ng’umbo, and Unga, which is spoken by Twa pygmies and sometimes considered a separate language (Nurse 2003). The Twa of Bangweulu speak another dialect of Bemba.

Phonology and orthography

The orthographical system in common use, originally introduced by Edward Steere, is quite phonetic. Its letters, with their approximate phonetic values, are given below.

It has become increasingly common to use 'c' in place of 'ch'. In common with other Bantu languages, as affixes are added, combinations of vowels may contract and consonants may change. For example, 'aa' changes to a long 'a', 'ae' and 'ai' change to 'e', and 'ao' and 'au' change to 'o' (in other cases, a 'y' is often used to separate other combinations of vowels). The nasal 'n' changes to 'm' before 'b' or 'p', and is pronounced ŋ before 'k' or 'g'; after 'n', 'l' changes to 'd'. These rules will all be implicit in the tables given below.

Like many Bantu languages, Bemba is tonal, with two tones; however, tone has limited effect on meaning as the number of words that would otherwise be confused is small. Stress tends to fall on the prefix, when it exists, and can lead to subtle differences of meaning (see the verb forms below).

Grammar

Many of the main features of Bemba grammar are fairly typical of Bantu languages: it is agglutinative, depends mainly on prefixes, has a system of several noun classes, a large set of verbal aspects and tenses, very few actual adjectives, and, like English, has a word order that is subject-verb-object. Most of the classification here is taken from that given by Schoeffer, Sheane and Cornwallis.

Nouns
Bemba nouns are divided into several partially-semantic classes. They are indicated by their prefixes and are generally similar but not always identical to the concord prefixes, attached to verbs they govern, adjectives qualifying them, and pronouns standing for them. By one convention, based on the plural, they are arranged as follows (most alternate forms are caused by phonetic considerations):

The prefixes in class 9 essentially indicate case: 'ku-' corresponds to 'to' or 'from', 'mu-' to 'in', 'into', or 'out of', and 'pa-' to 'at'.

Adjectives

As is common in Bantu languages, adjectives follow the words they qualify, and take the adjectival concord prefixes, but there are not many of them in the strictest sense. Adverbs, relative clauses, or 'descriptors', often fulfil their function instead. Descriptors are placed after the noun, with the particle '-a', and the relevant pronoun prefix between them: chintu cha nomba, 'new thing'.

Numerals

The numbers from 1 to 10 are:

The numerals 1-5 take adjectival concord prefixes (except for class 1 singular: muntu umo, 'one person'). The numerals 6-10 are left unchanged. 'Ikumi' has the plural 'makumi', which can be used as a noun with 'na' (and, with) to form all numbers up to 99: for example, makumi yatatu na pabula, 'thirty nine'. 100 is 'mwanda', with plural 'myanda'.

Pronouns

The class-independent personal pronouns are: 'ine' (1st person sg.), 'iwe' (2nd person sg.), 'ifwe' (1st person pl.), 'imwe' (2nd person pl.). These are absolute, in the sense that they stand alone, and cannot appear as subjects or objects as they are. There are separate possessive pronouns, and the third person pronouns depend on class. There are also demonstrative pronouns, divided both by class and into  three kinds by deixis ('this one, that one, and that one over there'), and relative pronouns are formed from these.

Verbs

Verbs have simple forms, usually ending in '-a' (everything before the 'a' being the 'stem', 'root' or 'radical'), and are agglutinated according to person, number and class of subject and object, tense, mood, voice, aspect and whether they are affirmative or negative. Further, their stems change to indicate various other shades of meaning. The following rules can all be combined in a mostly straightforward manner, Bemba being agglutinative and not inflective, but there are still some exceptions.

Subject and object prefixes

The subject prefixes and object infixes for the personal pronouns are given below. 
These can vary slightly according to mood, and the subject prefixes change for negative verbs. Where they are different, object prefixes are given in brackets.

The subject prefix is placed first, and then the object infix. When the subject or object is a specific noun in a given class, the verbal concord prefix of this class is used, and the negative form adds the prefix 'ta-' before this.

Tenses and Aspects

The classification given here is that presented by Schoeffer. 

Some of these require a modified stem, changing final 'a' to 'ile' if the preceding vowel is 'a', 'i' or 'u', and to 'ele' if it is 'e' or 'o', or, if the last consonant is nasal, changing the 'a' to 'ine' or 'ene' accordingly. There are irregularities in several verbs.

The tense infixes are given below. They come after the subject and object prefixes, and before the verb stem, except for the recent, completed or historic past in 'na-', which appears at the very beginning. Stress is marked with an acute (´) accent.

Moods

The moods correspond closely to the Bantu norms.

Imperative
The simple singular imperative is identical to the 'dictionary' form of the verb consisting of the stem and the suffix '-a', changing to an '-e' if an object prefix is used - there is no subject prefix. The simple plural imperative changes '-a' to '-eni'. Prefixing 'aku-' or 'uka-', adds a sense of instruction to resume or continue an action. An emphatic form can be given by using the subject pronoun prefix (generally of class 1) and following this by the infix '-inda-'.

Subjunctive

The subjunctive is used hypothetically,  as an indirect imperative, in exhortations, and in subordinate clauses, similarly but not identically to the subjunctive of many European languages. The common feature is a change of the final '-a' of the verb to '-e'. Its forms are given below. Here V stands for the verb stem, and P for any pronoun prefixes (infixes). The usual phonological rules apply.

The infinitive, strictly a verbal noun, has two forms. The simple form has prefix 'ku-' added to the simple form, as mentioned above, and the habitual infinitive has prefix 'kula-'.

Voices

The passive is formed by placing the infix '-w-' before the last vowel of the verb, but it is not frequently used. A 'neutral' voice can be formed by using '-ik-' instead if the preceding vowel is a, i or u, and '-ek-' if the preceding vowel is e or o. This form is differs in meaning from the passive in that it emphasises the state resulting from an action rather than the action itself (cf. English 'the pot is broken', as opposed to 'the ball is kicked').

Negation

Generally, the indicative prefixes 'ta-' to the subject prefix except for the first person singular which changes to 'nshi' or 'shi'. Generally, the subjunctive adds 'i' after the pronoun prefixes and in most cases changes a final 'e' to 'a'. The infinitive occasionally uses the negative 'te'. However, the precise rules are more complex, and the forms depend more finely on tense, aspect and mood. When the negative is used with the imperfect 'le', it is often in the sense of action not yet done, and is referred to by Schoeffer as a separate 'deferred tense'.

Other forms

There are several other verb forms which change the stem by adding an extra syllable before the final 'a'. These are given below.

There are also several compound tenses, many using the copula 'kuli' and 'kuba'.

Conjunctions

These are used to introduce coordinating or subordinate clauses, similarly to their use in English.

Basic phrases

ee - yes
awe - no
Uli shani? - how are you (informal)
Muli shani? - how are you (formal)
Shaleenipo - goodbye
Ishina lyandi ni... - My name is...
umuntu - person
umunandi - friend
umwana - child
iciBemba - the Bemba language
na - and, with
nga - like, as
suma (adj.) - good/beautiful
onse (adj.) - all
uluceelo (adj) - morning
 Natotela - Thank you
  Saana - A lot
 Natotela saana - Thanks a lot

Literature 
There is a sizeable amount of literature in Bemba. There are narratives, poems and plays. Some of the notable writers in Bemba include Stephen Mpashi, Chongo Kasonkomona, Chishimba, Paul Mushindo, Bwalya Chilangwa, Mwila Launshi and Kambole. 

A lot of the novels and narratives in Bemba were written between the period 1950 and 1980. Recently, very few creative works are published in Zambia mainly due to two reasons: the readership is generally poor and secondly, because of the first reason, publishers tend to hesitate to publish creative works in Bemba, especially novels of substantial length, for financial reasons due to the likely low levels of readership and thus profit. Instead, there are many short stories and novellas in Bemba literature.

Despite these hiccups, such as poor readership and lack of publishing, the quality of the works that are published in Bemba is often high. Moreover, there seem to be many talented writers who would like to write in this language but could not because of the reasons that have been given above and others that are related.

In terms of literary criticism, a lot of the works in Bemba have not been reviewed and critiqued. This is because there are very few literary critics in Bemba, though the interest is slowly growing. Some of these include Lutato and Shadreck Kondala, among others. Classic Bemba books include Uwauma Nafyala, Pano Calo and Imilimo ya bena Kale.

Sample text 
Abantu bonse bafyalwa abalubuka nokulingana mu mucinshi nensambu. Balikwata amano nokutontonkanya, eico bafwile ukulacita ifintu ku banabo mu mutima wa bwananyina.

Translation

All human beings are born free and equal in dignity and rights. They are endowed with reason and conscience and should act towards one another in a spirit of brotherhood. 

(Article 1 of the Universal Declaration of Human Rights)

See also

 Bemba people
 Bantu languages

Further reading

 Posner, Daniel N. (2003). "The Colonial Origins of Ethnic Cleavages: The Case of Linguistic Divisions in Zambia". Comparative Politics. 35 (2): 127–146.

References

External links

Bemba Online Project, https://scholarblogs.emory.edu/bemba/
Links to Bemba Grammatical Description, Texts, and Sound Files
PanAfrican L10n page on Bemba
Amalombelo Mu Cilala Portions of the Book of Common Prayer in Bemba, digitized by Richard Mammana and Charles Wohlers
Daniel Chola Musatwe, Mulenga Wa Mpanga, Lubuto Library Special Collections, accessed May 3, 2014.
Edward Mwango Kasase, Ku Bwaice, Lubuto Library Special Collections, accessed May 3, 2014.
Kapwepwe, S.M., Shalapa Canicadala, Lubuto Library Special Collections, accessed May 3, 2014.
Lehmann, Dorothea, Folktales from Zambia: Texts in six African languages and in English, Lubuto Library Special Collections, accessed May 3, 2014.
Nyambe Sumbwa, Zambian Proverbs, Lubuto Library Special Collections, accessed May 3, 2014.
OLAC resources in and about the Bemba language
Searchable data base of Bemba proverbs 

 
Sabi languages
Languages of the Democratic Republic of the Congo
Languages of Zambia
Languages of Botswana
Languages of Tanzania
Library of Congress Africa Collection related